Nezha Aït Baba Hlim is a Moroccan footballer who plays as a midfielder for Moroccan Women's Championship side Club Municipalité de Laâyoune and the Morocco women's national team.

Club career
Aït Baba has played for Municipal Laâyoune in the Moroccan league.

International career
Aït Baba has capped for Morocco at senior level.

See also
List of Morocco women's international footballers

References

Living people
Moroccan women's footballers
Women's association football midfielders
Morocco women's international footballers
Year of birth missing (living people)